Anasztázia Nguyen (born 9 January 1993) is a Hungarian track and field sprinter who specializes in the 60 metres, 100 metres, 200 metres and the long jump.

Early life and career
Nguyen was born in the Hungarian capital Budapest to a Vietnamese father and a Hungarian mother. Her father left the family when Anasztázia was a child and she was brought up by her mother.

She began her career in 2002 by KSI SE under the guidance of former Summer Universiade winner decathlete Dezső Szabó. First she also practiced long jumping and pole vaulting, but eventually decided to concentrate fully on sprint running. In 2009 Szabó switched to Budapesti Honvéd SE to where Nguyen followed her coach.

Among her best results are a silver medal from the 2009 World Youth Championships in medley relay, a seventh place in 100 metres on the same event and a fifth place from the 2010 Summer Youth Olympics also in 100 metres. In addition, Nguyen had won three Hungarian Athletics Championships in 100 metres (2009, 2010, 2011) and one in 200 metres (2011). She also the national junior record in 60 metres (7.40) and in 100 metres (11.55).

For her performances in 2011 she was given the Heraklész Award in the best female athlete category.

At Gyula memorial in 2019 showed a result of 6.70 metres in the long jump.

Personal bests
As of 30 May 2015

References

1993 births
Living people
Athletes from Budapest
Hungarian female sprinters
Hungarian people of Vietnamese descent
Athletes (track and field) at the 2010 Summer Youth Olympics
European Games competitors for Hungary
Athletes (track and field) at the 2019 European Games
Hungarian Athletics Championships winners
Athletes (track and field) at the 2020 Summer Olympics
Olympic athletes of Hungary